Derek Allen Abney (born December 19, 1980) is a former American college and professional football wide receiver.  He played college football for the University of Kentucky, and earned consensus All-American honors as a kick returner.  The Baltimore Ravens chose him in the seventh round of the 2004 NFL Draft, but he never played in a regular season National Football League (NFL) game.

Early years
Abney was born in Minot, North Dakota.  He attended D.C. Everest High School in Schofield, Wisconsin, where he played wide receiver for the Evergreens high school football team.  He led the Evergreens to a 14–0 record and a Division 1 state title his senior season.  He caught 62 passes for 1,309 yards and 14 touchdowns.  Abney was also received first-team all-state honors in both his junior and senior seasons.  He was voted to the second-team following his sophomore season.

College career
While attending the University of Kentucky, Abney was a wide receiver and kick returner for the Kentucky Wildcats football team from 2000 to 2003.  Abney left Kentucky with the second-most receiving yards in team history, and the second-most all-purpose yards in Southeastern Conference (SEC) history.  In addition to being recognized as a consensus first-team All-American as a junior in 2002, he was also a first-team All-SEC selection in 2002 and 2003.

Professional career
Abney was selected in the seventh round (244th pick overall) of the 2004 NFL Draft by the Baltimore Ravens, but he was released without playing in a regular season game.  Abney was signed by the Chicago Bears in the 2005 offseason, but again did not appear in a regular season game. After retiring from football, he began working as a civil engineer and is now a licensed professional engineer in South Carolina.

References

External links
  12 Derek Abney – Kentucky Wildcats player profile at UKAthletics.com

1980 births
Living people
All-American college football players
American football wide receivers
Baltimore Ravens players
Chicago Bears players
Kentucky Wildcats football players
Sportspeople from Minot, North Dakota
Players of American football from North Dakota